Lose This Life is the second and final studio album by American Christian rock band Tait. According to frontman Michael Tait, the songs all have to do with the striving human passion to know, feel and experience God's love.

It was released by ForeFront Records on November 4, 2003. It was later released to the Japanese market on April 15, 2004 through Epic Records Japan and on March 27, 2005 through Sony BMG Music Entertainment Philippines.

Rob Beckley, lead singer of the alternative rock band Pillar, appears in the second song "Numb". "Lose This Life" is the single that had been released in the U.S. release of Eyeshield 21.

Recording and production
Pre-production for Lose This Life began during the first week of March 2003.

Track listing

"Lose This Life" appeared on Gundam Seed, Gran Turismo 4, MahaGoGo, and the U.S. version of Eyeshield 21.

Music video
The title track, "Lose This Life", is the only song so far to have spawned a music video.

Personnel 

Tait
 Michael Tait – vocals
 Justin York – guitars
 Lonnie Chapin – bass
 Chad Chapin – drums

Additional musicians

 Mark Heimermann
 Matt Bronleewe
 Paul Moak
 Jerry McPherson
 Adam Lester
 Jay Johnson
 Javier Solis
 Todd Robbins
 Rob Beckley (from Pillar) – lead vocals (2)
 Carl Marsh – orchestra arrangements (12)
 Gavyn Wright – concertmaster (12)
 The London Session Orchestra – orchestra (12)

Production

 Michael Tait – producer (1–11)
 Mark Heimermann – producer (1, 2, 4–10)
 Matt Bronleewe – producer (3)
 Chad Chapin – producer (11)
 Brown Bannister – producer (12)
 Brent Milligan – executive producer, A&R direction 
 Charlie Peacock – A&R direction
 Todd Robbins – engineer, mixing (1, 3, 8, 9, 11, 12)
 Glen Spinner – engineer 
 Shane D. Wilson – engineer 
 Michael H. Brauer – mixing (2, 4–7, 10)
 Steve Bishir – recording (12)
 Grant Greene – assistant engineer
 Greg Lawrence – assistant engineer
 Melissa Mattey – assistant engineer
 Chris Barnett – assistant engineer (12)
 Tracy Martinson – digital editing (12)
 Greg Calbi – mastering (1–11)
 Doug Sax – mastering (12)
 Amy Guenthner – A&R coordinator
 PJ Heimmerman – production manager (1, 2, 4–10)
 Shawn Andrews – production coordinator 
 Susannah Parrish – creative coordinator 
 Scott McDaniel – art direction 
 Room 120 – design 
 Danny Clinch – photography 
 Jennifer Catron – artist development

References 

Tait (band) albums
2003 albums
ForeFront Records albums